Feuerwasser is the debut solo album by German rapper Curse.

Track listing 
  "Zehn Rap Gesetze"
  "Was Ist"
  "Wahre Liebe" 
  "Leavin' Las Vegas" feat. Der Klan
  "Ladykiller"
  "Entwicklungshilfe"
  "Unter 4 Augen"
  "Séance" feat. The Arsonists, Shabazz the Disciple and Stieber Twins 
  "Hassliebe"
  "Kaspaklatsche" feat. Der Klan
  "Weserwasser"
  "Auf Uns Ist Verlass" feat. Tone 
  "Licht & Schatten" feat. J-Luv
  "Schlußstrich"

References 

2000 albums
German-language albums
Jive Records albums